Callicarpa nudiflora is a species of beautyberry that is grown as an ornamental plant. It is native to Southeast Asia.

External links

nudiflora